A premarket tobacco application (PMTA) is an application that must be reviewed and approved by the Food and Drug Administration before a new tobacco product can be legally marketed in the United States. The first PMTA, and only to date, was approved by US FDA on November 10, 2015, when the FDA authorized the marketing of eight Swedish Match North America Inc. snus smokeless tobacco products (to be marketed under the brand name "General").

New tobacco product
A new tobacco product is either a product commercially marketed in the United States after February 15, 2007, or any modification to a tobacco product commercially marketed after February 15, 2007. If a predicate product existed prior to February 15, 2007, applicants can apply via the Substantial Equivalence (SE) regulatory pathway.

FDA deeming regulation
On May 10, 2016, the US FDA finalized its "deeming" rule, subjecting additional products to scrutiny under the Federal Food, Drug and Cosmetic Act as amended by the Family Smoking Prevention and Tobacco Control Act. The rule gives the US FDA authority to regulate e-cigarettes, cigars, and vape pens. The rule also authorizes FDA to take enforcement action against manufacturers who sell and distribute products with unsubstantiated modified risk tobacco product (MRTP) claims.

Compliance periods
FDA is establishing staggered initial compliance periods based on the expected complexity of the applications to be submitted, followed by continued 12-month compliance periods of FDA review. Substantial Equivalence exemptions have a total compliance period of 24 months and an enforcement deadline of August 8, 2017. Substantial Equivalence applications have a total compliance period of 30 months and an enforcement deadline of February 8, 2018. Premarket tobacco applications have a total compliance period of 36 months and an enforcement deadline of August 8, 2018.

See also
Regulation of tobacco by the U.S. Food and Drug Administration

References

Food and Drug Administration
Tobacco control
Tobacco in the United States